Kosivska Poliana is a village in the Rakhiv Raion (district) of Zakarpattia Oblast (province) of western Ukraine, located at .

Villages in Rakhiv Raion